Ashley Howard may refer to:

Ashley Howard (curler), Canadian curler
Ashley Howard (basketball), American basketball player and coach